Ecumenical Council of Lyon may refer to two councils held in the Primacy of Lyon:
the First Ecumenical Council of Lyon in 1245, being the Thirteenth Ecumenical Council
the Second Ecumenical Council of Lyon in 1274